Woman's Foreign Missionary Society of the Methodist Episcopal Church (WFMS of the MEC)  was one of three Methodist organizations in the United States focused on women's foreign missionary services, the others being the WFMS of the Free Methodist Church of North America and the WFMS of the Methodist Protestant Church. 

The WFMS of the MEC was founded in the Tremont Street Methodist Episcopal Church, in Boston, Massachusetts, March 1869, and incorporated under the laws of the State of New York in 1884. Its fields of operation included: Europe (Bulgaria, Italy, France); Latin America (Mexico); South America (Argentine Republic, Peru, Uruguay); Asia (British Malaysia, China, Chosen/Korea, India, Japan); Africa (Algeria, Angola, Portuguese East Africa, Rhodesia, Tunis); and Oceania (Phillippine Islands).

History
The WMFS was organized in the Tremont Street MEC, Boston, in March 1869 by eight women who responded to a call sent to thirty churches. The eight founders were, Mrs. Lewis Flanders; Mrs. Thomas Kingsbury; Mrs. William B. Merrill; Lois Lee Parker; Mrs. Thomas A. Rich; Mrs. H.J. Stoddard; Mrs. William Butler (Clementina Rowe Butler); and Mrs. P.T. Taylor. A window in the Tremont Street Church commemorates the event and preserves their names. 

The first public meeting of the society was held in the Bromfield Street MEC, May 26, 1869. The discussion was quickly followed by decisive action. At a business meeting held by the women at the close of the public occasion, it was voted to raise money to send as a missionary to India, Isabella Thoburn, sister of Bishop James Mills Thoburn. An appeal for a medical woman soon followed. As a result of prompt and efficient measures to procure funds, the services of Isabella Thoburn and of Clara Swain, M.D., were secured. These two women sailed from New York City for India, via England, on November 3, 1869, reaching their destination early in January, 1870. They were cordially received, and soon entered upon their work, Thoburn organizing schools and superintending the work of Bible readers, and Swain's medical ability gaining for her admission to many places that were closed to others. This society sent to India, China, Korea, and Japan the first woman medical missionary ever received in those countries. 

By 1903, its 34th year, it had 265 missionaries carrying on its work in India, China, Japan, Korea, Africa, Bulgaria, Italy, South America, Mexico, and the Philippines, by means of women's colleges, high schools, seminaries, hospitals, dispensaries, day schools, and "settlement work".

Six branches were organized the first year. By 1903, there were eleven, the first being the New England, and the eleventh being the Columbia River Branch.

Publications

The first number of the society's first periodical, The Heathen Woman's Friend, appeared in June, 1869, with Harriet Merrick Warren as its editor for 24 years. Other publications were established later on.

WFMS of other Methodist denominations
Other Methodist denominations developed their own women's foreign missionary organizations. 

The WFMS of the Methodist Protestant Church was established in 1879. Its office was in Catonsville, Maryland. Its focused on Asia, especially China and Japan. It issued the periodical, The Woman's Missionary Record. Notable people included Mrs. E. C. Chandler, Mrs. Henry Hupfield, Mrs. D. S. Stephens, Mrs. L. K. East, and Mrs. J. F. McCulloch.

The WFMS of the Free Methodist Church of North America was established in 1882. Its office was in Oneida, New York. It issued the periodical, Missionary Tidings. Notable people included Mary L. Coleman, Mrs. C. T. Bolles, and Lillian C. Jensen.

Notable people

 Mary Osburn Adkinson
 Esther E. Baldwin
 Annie Maria Barnes
 Susan Hammond Barney
 Anna Fisher Beiler
 Anna Smeed Benjamin
 Martia L. Davis Berry
 Jennie M. Bingham
 Sophia Blackmore
 Ariel Serena Hedges Bowen
 Maria Kane Brown
 Adda Burch
 Louise L. Chase
 Lucilla Green Cheney
 Lucinda L. Combs
 Mary Helen Peck Crane
 Allie Luse Dick
 Hü King Eng
 Mary Porter Gamewell 
 Jennie Margaret Gheer
 Annie Ryder Gracey
 Lucinda Barbour Helm
 Louise Manning Hodgkins
 Caroline Elizabeth Merrick
 Mary A. Miller
 Nancie Monelle
 Cornelia Moore Chillson Moots
 Mary Clarke Nind
 Esther Pak
 Anna Campbell Palmer
 Rebecca Parrish
 Alice E. Heckler Peters
 Mary Q. Porter
 Mary Reed
 Jane Bancroft Robinson
 Elizabeth Russell
 Mary F. Scranton
 Liang May Seen
 Cora E. Simpson
 Susan J. Swift Steele
 Ōyama Sutematsu
 Clara Swain
 Lucy Robbins Messer Switzer
 Isabella Thoburn
 Mary Sparkes Wheeler
 Charlotte Frances Wilder
 Zara A. Wilson
 Annie Turner Wittenmyer

Gallery

See also
 Lessie Bates Davis Neighborhood House
 Lucy Webb Hayes National Training School
 Protestant missions in China
 Women's missionary societies

References

Attribution
 
 
 
 
 

Woman's Foreign Missionary Society of the Methodist Episcopal Church
Christian women's organizations
1869 establishments in Massachusetts
Religious organizations based in Boston
History of Methodism in the United States
Women's organizations based in the United States